John Hugh Todd Anderson (11 January 1937 – July 2021) was a Scottish-born footballer who played in the Football League for Stoke City and represented the Australian national team five times in full international matches.

Career
Anderson was born in Johnstone and played for local side Johnstone Burgh. In 1957 he joined Stoke City and he made an instant impact scoring on his debut against Rotherham United in September 1957. However Anderson was used as a backup during his four-year spell at the Victoria Ground making 24 appearances scoring twice.

In the mid-1960s after a spell back in Scotland with Greenock Morton and Third Lanark he moved to Australia to play with South Melbourne where he came to the notice of the Australian selectors. He eventually played eight matches for the Socceroos, five of which were full internationals.

Career statistics

Club

International
Source:

References

External links
 

1937 births
2021 deaths
Australia international soccer players
Australian soccer players
Association football wingers
Greenock Morton F.C. players
People from Johnstone
Scottish expatriate footballers
Scottish Football League players
Scottish footballers
South Melbourne FC players
Stoke City F.C. players
English Football League players
Third Lanark A.C. players
South Melbourne FC managers
Johnstone Burgh F.C. players
Footballers from Renfrewshire
Scottish emigrants to Australia
Scottish football managers